The Chrislea Super Ace is a 1940s British four-seat light aircraft built by Chrislea Aircraft Limited.

History
The Super Ace was developed from the earlier Chrislea C.H.3 Series 1 Ace, a high-wing four seat cabin monoplane with a tricycle undercarriage and two fins.  The Ace had an unusual 'steering wheel' control arrangement which eliminated the conventional rudder bar.  The wheel was mounted on a universal joint; turning it applied aileron, moving it vertically applied elevator and sideways the rudder. It originally flew with a single vertical tail but was soon modified with twin fins.  The lone C.H.3 Series 1 Ace first flew in September 1946.

Soon after the company moved to Exeter, the first production aircraft, the C.H.3 Series 2 Super Ace flew in February 1948. This model was powered by a de Havilland Gipsy Major 10 inline piston engine. Wing and tailplane were now metal structures, the span was increased by 2 ft compared with the Ace, and the fins were smaller and rounder. The control system of the first Super Ace was not well received and, as a result, that aircraft and all other Series 3 machines had a rudder bar. Construction was initiated on a production run of 32 aircraft, but only 18 Super Aces were completed and flown.  Only 3 of these stayed in the UK; the rest were either immediately exported (12), exported after time in the UK (2) or worked abroad under British registration in the Near East (1).  Super Aces flew in Europe (Switzerland), Africa (Gold Coast, South Africa), Asia (Japan, British Malaya, Pakistan), South America (Argentina, Brazil) and Australasia (Australia, New Zealand). 
 
The final variant, taken from the Super Ace production run, was the C.H.3 Series 4 Skyjeep, first flown in August 1949. The Skyjeep had a tailwheel landing gear, a conventional control stick instead of the wheel and removable top decking on the rear fuselage.  A fuselage stretch of 8.5 in improved the legroom and, combined with the accessible rear fuselage, provided a more flexible internal space.  It was powered by a 155 hp Blackburn Cirrus Major 3 engine.

In all, three Skyjeeps were built and sold in Uruguay, Indochina and Australia.  The Australian machine flew there with a 200 hp de Havilland Gipsy Six engine for a time, but has since been refitted with the Cirrus and is now flying in the UK.

Sales of the two types were disappointing and 11 of the 32 planned were either not completed (6) or built but not flown (5).  These were scrapped in 1952 when the company assets were bought by C.E. Harper Aircraft Limited.

Variants
C.H.3 Series 1 Ace four-seat high-wing monoplane with tricycle undercarriage powered by a  Lycoming O-290 engine, one built.
C.H.3 Series 2 Super Ace  de Havilland Gipsy Major 10 powered. Greater span, rudder bar provided. 18 flown.
C.H.3 Series 3 Skyjeep Military A.O.P. and ambulance aircraft, essentially similar to the series 4.
C.H.3 Series 4 Skyjeep conventional controls and tailwheel, 155 hp Blackburn Cirrus Major 3 powered. 3 flown.

Survivors

Recently there have been two flying Super Aces in the UK, G-AKVF and G-AKUW, plus a Skyjeep (G-AKVR).There is also a recently restored Super Ace ZK-ASI in Ashburton Aviation Museum, New Zealand

Specifications (C.H.3 Series 4)

See also
 General Skyfarer
 General Aircraft Cygnet

References

Further reading

External links

Super Ace controls

1940s British civil utility aircraft
High-wing aircraft
Single-engined tractor aircraft
Super Ace
Aircraft first flown in 1948
Twin-tail aircraft